Specs Ellis is an American former Negro league pitcher who played in the 1930s and 1940s.

Ellis made his Negro leagues debut in 1937 with the Jacksonville Red Caps. He spent several seasons with the club, and also played for the Birmingham Black Barons and Cincinnati Clowns.

References

External links
 and Seamheads

Year of birth missing
Place of birth missing
Birmingham Black Barons players
Cincinnati Clowns players
Cleveland Bears players
Jacksonville Red Caps players
Baseball pitchers